George Burley was a Scottish manager and former footballer.

George Burley may also refer to:

George Burley (English footballer)

See also
George Berley, Hudson's Bay Company captain
George Burleigh (disambiguation)